Ghassan Keyrouz (born 15 February 1951) is a Lebanese alpine skier. He competed at the 1968 Winter Olympics and the 1972 Winter Olympics.

References

1951 births
Living people
Lebanese male alpine skiers
Olympic alpine skiers of Lebanon
Alpine skiers at the 1968 Winter Olympics
Alpine skiers at the 1972 Winter Olympics
People from Bsharri